Bert R. Anthony (1876–1923) was an American composer.  He wrote a number of pedagogical works for piano, and also composed a handful of songs.

References

External links
 

1876 births
1923 deaths
American male composers
American classical composers